The grey-chested dove (Leptotila cassinii) is a species of bird in the family Columbidae. It is found in Belize, Colombia, Costa Rica, Guatemala, Honduras, Mexico, Nicaragua, and Panama.

Taxonomy and systematics

The grey-chested dove is closely related to the Tolima dove (Leptotila conoveri) and ochre-bellied dove (L. ochraceiventris), and might form a superspecies with them. It has three subspecies, the nominate L. c. cassinii, L. c. cerviniventris, and L. c. rufinucha.

Description

The nominate subspecies has a pinkish gray forehead and face, dark brown crown and nape, and an iridescent grayish purple hindneck. Its upperparts are olive-brown with an iridescent green or purple mantle. The tail is darker than the back and the outer feathers have white tips. Its throat is white, the breast reddish gray, and the belly reddish. The eye is shades of yellow surrounded by bare gray skin that is reddish at its front and back. The legs and feet are red. Males and females are essentially alike but that the female is darker overall. L. c. rufinucha is paler than the nominate, with a purplish breast and a rusty buff crown and nape. L. c. cerviniventris is similar to rufinucha but the breast is a stronger purplish pink.

Distribution and habitat

The nominate subspecies of grey-chested dove is found from Panama's Canal Zone into northern Colombia. L. c. cerviniventris is found from Chiapas in southeastern Mexico south through Belize, Honduras, Nicaragua, and northwestern Costa Rica into western Panama. L. c. rufinucha is found in southwestern Costa Rica and northwestern Panama. It inhabits secondary forest from sea level to at most .

Behavior

Feeding

The grey-chested dove forages on the ground alone or in pairs; it does not flock. Though its diet is poorly known, it has been documented eating seeds and small insects.

Breeding

The grey-chested dove's breeding season varies across its range. In Costa Rica it has two seasons, February to May and July to September. In Panama it breeds between February and September and in Colombia apparently from January to April. The clutch size is two eggs.

Vocalization

The grey-chested dove's song is "a single mournful monotonous note 'woOOOooo' which fades rapidly in and slowly fades out."

Status

The IUCN has assessed the grey-chested dove as being of Least Concern. Though its biology and ecology are poorly known, the species is considered fairly common in most of its range.

References

grey-chested dove
Birds of Central America
grey-chested dove
grey-chested dove
Taxonomy articles created by Polbot